Pearl Chase was a civic leader in Santa Barbara, California. She is best known for her significant impact on the historic preservation and conservation of that city.

Early life

Chase was born in Boston, Massachusetts and moved to Santa Barbara at the age of 12. After graduating from Santa Barbara High School in 1904, she attended the University of California at Berkeley where she was a member of Kappa Alpha Theta. She graduated with a Bachelor of Letters in history in 1909.

Civic advocacy

Upon returning to Santa Barbara after graduating from the University of California at Berkeley, Chase was appalled at the state of her hometown:

 I was ashamed of the dirt and dust and ugly buildings and resolved then and there to devote my life to making Santa Barbara beautiful.

She had a significant influence on the architecture of the city of Santa Barbara, but Chase never held political or government office of any sort. Chase was largely responsible for the recasting of Santa Barbara architecture  in the Spanish Colonial Style in the wake of the 1925 Santa Barbara earthquake.  She founded a number of civic institutions in Santa Barbara, including the local chapter of the American Red Cross, the Community Arts Association, the Santa Barbara Trust for Historic Preservation, and the Indian Defense Association.

She was involved in advocacy for the protection of multiple local landmarks, including Chase Palm Park (which bears a  plaque memorializing Chase and her brother), as well as the Moreton Bay Fig Tree.

In addition, she was part of an interest group which successfully lobbied the State Legislature, Governor Earl Warren, and the Regents of the University of California to move the Santa Barbara State Teachers College to the University of California system in 1944.

Historian Walker A. Tompkins summarized her influence on the city by saying that "She did more to beautify her adopted home town of Santa Barbara than any other individual."

Legacy

Chase was part of the founding of an organization called the Santa Barbara Council of Christmas Cheer, which brought gifts to needy community members. This organization was eventually formalized as the Unity Shoppe, a storefront on State Street which "operates a year-round 'Free' grocery and clothing store so people can shop with dignity for their basic needs."

A scholarship in Chase's name has been instituted at University of California, Santa Barbara in the department of Environmental Studies. In addition, the Pearl Chase Society, a not-for-profit organization "dedicated to preserving Santa Barbara’s historic architecture, landscapes and cultural heritage," seeks to carry on her work.

Chase was buried in Santa Barbara Cemetery.

References

External links
 About Pearl Chase
 Pearl Chase - 2003 Honoree

Resources 
 Community Development and Conservation Collection, University of California, Santa Barbara
 Pearl Chase Papers, University of California, Santa Barbara

1888 births
1979 deaths
People from Santa Barbara, California
Philanthropists from California
American women philanthropists
20th-century American philanthropists
20th-century women philanthropists